Kalikst Witkowski (2 April 1818 in Kobryn – 24 July 1877 in Karlovy Vary) was a Russian general and President of Warsaw from 1863 to 1875.  He was the son of Kacper Witkowski and Józefa (nee Pągowska).

1818 births
1877 deaths
Mayors of Warsaw
People from Kobryn